Yesus Segundo Cabrera Ramírez (born 15 September 1990) is a Colombian footballer who plays as a midfielder for Colombian club América de Cali.

Career

Cuiabá
On 22 July 2021 Cabrera signed with Cuiabá, his first opportunity to play abroad. He debuted on 18 August 2021 against Grêmio in a 1–0 Campeonato Brasileiro Série A loss.

References

Living people
1990 births
Association football midfielders
Colombian footballers
La Equidad footballers
Real Cartagena footballers
Deportes Tolima footballers
América de Cali footballers
Deportivo Pasto footballers
Once Caldas footballers
Cuiabá Esporte Clube players
Categoría Primera A players
Categoría Primera B players
Campeonato Brasileiro Série A players
Colombian expatriate sportspeople in Brazil
Expatriate footballers in Brazil
Sportspeople from Cartagena, Colombia